The Sierra Pelona Valley AVA is an American Viticultural Area in a valley of the Sierra Pelona Mountains, located in northwestern Los Angeles County, California.

The valley is a part of the High Desert region on the southwestern edge of the Antelope Valley and Mojave Desert. The AVA is northwest of Metropolitan Los Angeles in Southern California.

Geography and climate
Additionally, air movement along the valley helps to reduce the risk of frost, leaf fungus, and insect pests.

See also
 Antelope Valley of the California High Desert AVA
 Leona Valley AVA — Sierra Pelona.

References

American Viticultural Areas of California
American Viticultural Areas of Southern California
Sierra Pelona Ridge
Geography of Los Angeles County, California
Valleys of Los Angeles County, California
American Viticultural Areas
2010 establishments in California